The Edo OSE was a 1940s American single-seat multi-role floatplane designed and manufactured by the Edo Aircraft Corporation.

Design and development

The Edo Aircraft Corporation was an established company that produced seaplane floats.  In 1946, Edo designed its first aircraft, the Edo OSE. Two prototype aircraft (designated XOSE-1) were built and flown in 1946. The XOSE-1 was a single-seat low-wing cantilever monoplane with a single float and fixed wingtip stabilizing floats. The wings could be folded for shipboard storage. The aircraft was designed for a variety of roles including observation and anti-submarine patrols. Unusually, it was designed to carry a rescue cell on the underwing hardpoints, which would be capable of carrying a single person when used for air-sea rescue. Eight production aircraft (designated XOSE-1) were built to a United States Navy order but none were accepted into service. A two-seat training conversion was carried out as the XTE-1, but production TE-2 aircraft were cancelled.

Variants

XS2E-1
Original designation for OSE and TE single seat floatplane scouts.
XOSE-1
Prototypes and production single-seat aircraft redesignated from XS2E-1; eight built.
XOSE-2
Prototype two-seat floatplane scout aircraft, two converted from XOSE-1.
OSE-2
Production two-seat floatplane scout aircraft, four aircraft were assigned Bureau of Aeronautics numbers (BuNos.), but production was cancelled.
XSO2E-1
Original designation for XTE-1 conversions.
XTE-1
Two-seat floatplane trainer conversions, two aircraft converted from the XOSE-1 prototypes.
TE-2
Developed from the TE-1, four aircraft were assigned BuNos., but production was cancelled.

Specifications (XOSE-1)

See also

References

External links

AeroWeb

Floatplanes
1940s United States military reconnaissance aircraft
OSE
Cancelled military aircraft projects of the United States
Single-engined tractor aircraft
Low-wing aircraft
Aircraft first flown in 1946